Aglossodes pineaui is a species of snout moth in the genus Aglossodes. It was described by Rougeot, in 1977. It is found in Ethiopia.

References

Moths described in 1977
Pyralinae
Moths of Africa